Sri Darma Muneeswaran Temple is a Hindu temple in Serangoon North, Singapore. It is located at 17 Serangoon North Avenue 1.

This temple has been in existence at the present site for more than a century.

Inside the temple is a statue of Dharma Muneeswaran (a form of Shiva) and his consorts Vinayaka, Murugan, and Mariyamman. There are also small statues of Rama, Sita, Lakshmana, and Hanuman. The temple boasts the largest statue of Nāga in South East Asia. Hindus offer prayers and special pujas for the Kala Sarpa Dosha avoidance. The Navagraha sanctum is just behind the Naga statue.

The temple has completed its 12-year cycle of redevelopment and refurbishment works and the Maha Kumbabishegam (Consecration Ceremony) of the Temple and its Deities has been fixed for May 1, 2013.

References
Darma Muneeswaran

Hindu temples in Singapore
Indian diaspora in Singapore
Buildings and structures in Ang Mo Kio
Tamil Singaporean